is an action role-playing game developed by Sega AM2 and published by Sega on the Sega RingEdge arcade platform. It is part of the Shining series from Sega. It is developed by the same development team as Quest of D. It was only released in Japan in arcades and received no port of any kind.

It was updated four times across its lifespan, with subtitles Raid, Elysion, Exlesia and Exlesia Zenith. The online support ended on November 1, 2016.

Six official soundtracks were released from all the various version of the game.

Gameplay 
The game follows the same format as Quest of D, however with the difference that there are no physical trading cards to collect.

With Raid, the game was updated so it can be played with up 6 players instead of 4. From Elysion onwards the game can be played up to 8 players in the special elysion mode where the players fight against enemies in a vast field. Classes available are human, half beast, elf, birdling and dark race. Weapons that can be wielded are sword, magic gun, hammer, flail, knuckle, and dagger as well as magic weapons and magic armor. The gameplay style differs heavily depending on which weapon is used. Characters can be customised in appearance, voice, height and gender. Except for gender, everything can be changed at any point in the game.

Reception 
Within one month, nearly 2,400 Shining Force Cross machines had been sold to arcade operators by December 31, 2009.

References

External links 
Official website
Official website (Raid)
Official website (Elysion)
Official website (Exlesia)

Shining (series)
Japan-exclusive video games
Video games developed in Japan
Sega arcade games
Arcade video games
Arcade-only video games
2009 video games
Sega-AM2 games
Fantasy video games
Sega Games franchises
Multi-player card games
Action role-playing video games
Massively multiplayer online games
Hack and slash role-playing games